Kasintuwu Stadium is a football stadium in the town of Poso, Indonesia. The stadium has a capacity of 3,000 people. The stadium was built in 1960 and is considered as one of the best stadiums in Central Sulawesi. It is the home base of Persipos Poso, Poso FC, and PS Poso.

On August 3, 2006, around 20:00 pm, a bomb exploded at the back of Kasintuwu Stadium, which is located right next to the General Hospital of Poso.

References

Sports venues in Indonesia
Football venues in Indonesia